Chris Festa, born in Atlanta on September 5, 1985, is an American auto racing driver.

Festa raced the #9 Dallara for Chip Ganassi Racing in the Indy Pro Series in 2007. He also served as Target Chip Ganassi Racing's development driver where he did all the test and development driving for the team's IndyCar program during the 2007 and 2008 Seasons. His work contributed heavily to the win in the 2008 Indy 500 and 2008 IndyCar Series Championship for Scott Dixon. As of the end of the 2007 season he has made 39 IPS starts with a best finish of 2nd (3 times) and won the pole for the first race of the 2007 season at Homestead-Miami Speedway. Festa finished 6th, 8th, and 10th in series points in his first three seasons in the Pro Series, respectively.

He previously competed in the Toyota Atlantic series in 2004 for Rahal Letterman Racing where he was teammates with Danica Patrick. and finished 8th in series points at the age of 18. Chris Festa was a surprise addition to the #7 SAMAX Motorsport Daytona Prototype team for the 2007 24 Hours of Daytona, but drove well and the team finished a respectable 6th place. He returned to the series, now known as the Firestone Indy Lights Series driving for the new Alliance Motorsports team. Festa left the team after 7 races with a best finish of 5th in the season opener at Homestead-Miami after the team's funding ran out. He finished 22nd in points.

Over the course of Festa's career, he won over 60 races and was known for his aggressive style.

Festa is a brother of Kappa Sigma at Florida State University.

Festa is now retired from professional racing and is currently living in Atlanta, Georgia.

Complete motorsports results

American Open-Wheel racing results
(key) (Races in bold indicate pole position, races in italics indicate fastest race lap)

USF2000 National Championship results

Atlantic Championship

Indy Lights

External links
 Official Homepage

1985 births
American racing drivers
Atlantic Championship drivers
Indy Lights drivers
Living people
North American Formula Renault drivers
Racing drivers from Atlanta
U.S. F2000 National Championship drivers
Florida State University alumni
Arrow McLaren SP drivers
Rahal Letterman Lanigan Racing drivers
Cheever Racing drivers
Chip Ganassi Racing drivers